1997 World Air Games (1997 WAG) was an international competition of air sports, held between September 15–21, 1997 in Selçuk, Turkey, hosted by Turkish Aeronautical Association (THK). It was the first of World Air Games organized by Fédération Aéronautique Internationale (World Air Sports Federation - FAI) once every four years. The games marked the first time more than 3000 participants from 60 countries took part in 16 different championship categories at 7 different locations at the same time.

Participation
Out of about 80 FAI members, 60 countries took part in the 1997 WAG, with 1714 athletes and  3183 participants. The list of participating countries is as follows:

Competitions
The first World Air Games consisted of competitions in the following categories:

Parachuting
 1st World Parachuting Championships in Freestyle and Skysurfing
 12th World Parachuting Championships in Formation Skydiving
 9th World Cup of Parachuting Champions in Style and Accuracy

Competitions were held in THK Selçuk (Ephesus) Training Center near Selçuk-Ephesus.  10,408 jumps and 707 sorties have been made.

Air race and general aviation
 10th World Air Rally Flying Championships
 1st World Air Games Long Range Air Race
 1,640 flight hours were flown with 42 aircraft and 513 sorties.

Gliding
 1st World Gliding Championship in World Class
In the part held in THK İnönü Training Center in İnönü, Eskişehir,  319 flights were flown by gliders. The aircraft made 268 sorties of retrieval with a total flight time of 83 hours. In Antalya - Karain airport 260 sorties have been made with gliders.

Aerobatics
 7th World Glider Aerobatic Championships
 Europeans Unlimited Aerobatics Championships
Held in Antalya - Karain airport with 228 sorties.

Aeromodelling
 World Championship in Class F3B
 World Championship in Class F3C
 World Cup in Classes F1A, F1B, F1C for seniors
 European Aeromodelling Championships in Classes F1A, F1B, F1J for juniors
 European Aeromodelling Championships in Classes S1B, S3A, S5C, S6A, S7, S8E

Microlight
 1st World Air Games Microlight Championships
Held in Aydın, with 22 hours of flight with ultralights.

Hang gliding
 1st World Air Games Hang gliding Championships
Held in Aydın, with 53 hours of flight with powered hang gliders. In Denizli - Pamukkale,  699 flights were completed in hang gliding.

Paragliding
 1st World Air Games Paragliding Championships
Held in Aydın, with 28 hours of flight with powered paragliders. In Denizli - Pamukkale,  1,040 flights were completed in paragliding.

Ballooning
 1st World Air Games Ballooning Championship
Held in Cappadocia region with  868 hours balloon flight with 62 balloons and 7 hours flight time.

Results

Aviation competitions and awards
1997 in Turkish sport
Air Games
Sports competitions in Izmir
Multi-sport events in Turkey
September 1997 sports events in Turkey
Aviation history of Turkey
20th century in İzmir